Wyoming is a state in the mountain region of the western United States. The mineral extraction industry, including oil and gas, is the main driver of the Wyoming economy, accounting for more than three-fifths of the state's revenues. Travel and tourism is the second-largest sector in the state, providing $3.3 billion to the state's economy, with $170 million in tax revenues in 2015, along with 32,000 jobs. Primary tourism draws are natural, including Yellowstone National Park and Grand Teton National Park.

Wyoming is one a few states that does not levy a corporate income tax and is often cited as a "pro-growth" state for its business tax climate.

Notable firms 
This list includes notable companies with primary headquarters located in the state. The industry and sector follow the Industry Classification Benchmark taxonomy. Organizations which have ceased operations are included and noted as defunct.

References 

Companies
Wyoming